Brian Burns may refer to:

 Brian Burns (American football) (born 1998), American football player
 Brian Burns (screenwriter), American screenwriter and film producer
 Brian D. Burns (born 1939), former Vermont Lieutenant Governor
 Brian P. Burns (born 1936), American entrepreneur, attorney and philanthropist
 Bryan E. Burns (born 1970), American archeologist

See also
Brian Byrne (disambiguation)